Philipp Erhardt (born 10 September 1993) is an Austrian professional footballer who plays as a midfielder for TSV Hartberg.

References

Living people
1993 births
Austrian footballers
Association football defenders
Austrian Football Bundesliga players
2. Liga (Austria) players
3. Liga players
SV Mattersburg players
Türkgücü München players
TSV Hartberg players
Austrian expatriate footballers
Austrian expatriate sportspeople in Germany
Expatriate footballers in Germany